Yunnan Astronomical Observatory (YAO) an institution of Chinese Academy of Sciences sits on the Phoenix Hill in the east suburbs of Kunming, Yunnan, China. It is the only research observatory in the southwest of China. It is a state institution for astronomy research and public science education. There are 8 research groups and 2 observing stations in YAO.

It was founded during the Japanese invasion of China by astronomers from the Beijing Astronomical Observatory and the Purple Mountain Observatory evacuated from their home
towns.

Groups: 
 Solar physics 
 Stellar physics 
 Stellar population 
 Extragalactic physics 
 AGN jets 
 Binary Population Synthesis 
 High-energy astrophysics 
 Astrodynamics & astrometry 
 Southern Observing Station

Facilities: 
 Lijiang 2.4 m telescope 
 Fuxian Lake 1 m solar tower 
 ynao 1 m telescope 
 40 m radio telescope

See also
National Astronomical Observatory of China
List of observatory codes
List of astronomical observatories around the world

External links

Official website
Official English website
Kunming Branch of CAS
SLR Global Performance Report Card

Astronomical observatories in China
Research institutes of the Chinese Academy of Sciences
Buildings and structures in Kunming
1938 establishments in China